The year 2015 in art involves various significant events.

Events

 February - Paul Gauguin's painting When Will You Marry? sells for $300m (£197m), reportedly to Qatar Museums, the highest known price ever paid for any work of art
 April - The accused rapist in the Emma Sulkowicz case which inspired the art piece "Mattress Performance (Carry That Weight)" files suit in United States Federal Court in Manhattan against Columbia University, its art department chairman Jon Kessler, and the University president Lee C. Bollinger, saying through his attorneys, that he is the victim of gender discrimination and a "witch hunt".
 April 2 - Sir Peter Blake's temporary artwork Everybody Razzle Dazzle, Mersey Ferry MV Snowdrop painted in a variation of dazzle camouflage, enters service on the River Mersey in England.
 April 13 - A South African man is charged with vandalising a Johannesburg statue of Mahatma Gandhi by attempting to paint it white.
 May 1 - The new Whitney Museum of American Art facility in the Meatpacking District, Manhattan, designed by Renzo Piano, opens. 
May 11 -  One canvas, "Version O", the final painting from a series of fifteen paintings and numerous drawings entitled Les Femmes d'Alger by Pablo Picasso created after the death of his friend and contemporary Henri Matisse sells for $179.4  million U.S (with fees) at Christie's in New York City thus establishing a new record for the highest price ever paid at auction for a work of art.  At the same sale "Pointing Man", a work by the Swiss artist Alberto Giacometti sells for $141.3 million U.S., making it the highest price ever paid for a sculpture at auction.
August 21 - Street artist Banksy opens Dismaland, a temporary art project in the seaside resort town of Weston-super-Mare in Somerset, England.
September - Rembrandt's early painting Unconscious Patient (Allegory of Smell) (from The Senses series, 1624-5) emerges at an auction in New Jersey and is purchased for the Leiden Collection in New York City.
September 20 - The Broad contemporary art museum in Downtown Los Angeles, designed by Diller Scofidio + Renfro, opens.
October 2 - La Artcore Gallery in Los Angeles, US, presents "Excessivist Initiative", an exhibition that marks the beginning of the Excessivism movement in art. 
October 8 - Newport Street Gallery in South London, a conversion of 1913 theatrical workshops into a free public art gallery for Damien Hirst by Caruso St John architects opens.
November 10 - The Brigadier by Lucian Freud, a portrait of Andrew Parker Bowles in his British Army uniform sells for $34.89 million US at Christie's in New York City.
December 6 -  A woman at the Art Basel Miami Beach art fair stabs another in plain sight of art goers and the incident is at first ignored as people think that it is a work of performance art.

Exhibitions

January 31 until May 31 - Coney Island: Visions of an American Dreamland, 1861–2008 at the Wadsworth Atheneum in Hartford, Connecticut.
February 6 until May 10 - Treasures from Chopin's Country. Polish Art from the 15th to 20th Century at the National Museum of China in Beijing.
February 6 until May 3 - Tapies: From Within at the Pérez Art Museum Miami.
February 20 until May 24 - Kehinde Wiley: A New Republic at the Brooklyn Museum in Brooklyn, New York - then traveled to the Modern Art Museum of Fort Worth in Fort Worth, Texas from September 20 until January 10, 2016 and to the Virginia Museum of Fine Arts in Richmond, Virginia from June 11. 2016 until September 5, 2016
February 25 until May 24 - The "2015 Triennial: Surround Audience" at the New Museum in New York City.
February 1 until May 3 - Once in a Lifetime: Piero di Cosimo  at the National Gallery of Art, Washington, then travels to Galleria degli Uffizi, Florence (June 23–September 27, 2015).
March 7 until June 7 - Björk (exhibition) at MOMA in New York City.
March 10 until September 20- Richard Estes: Painting New York City at the Museum of Arts and Design in New York City.
March 26 until September 13 - Water to Paper, Paint to Sky: The Art of Tyrus Wong at the Museum of Chinese in America" in New York City.
May 9 until September 22 - "Sean Scully: Land Sea" at the Palazzo Falier in Venice, Italy.
May 1 until September 27 - America is Hard to See at the Whitney Museum of American Art in New York City.
May 17 - September 7 - "Yoko Ono: One Woman Show, 1960–1971" at MOMA in New York City.
June 5 until August 30 - Polish Art: Enduring Spirit at the National Museum of Korea in Seoul.
June 28 until October 4 - Gustave Caillebotte: The Painter's Eye at the National Gallery of Art, Washington.
June 30 until October 4 - "Sargent: Portraits of Artists and Friends" at the Metropolitan Museum of Art in New York CIty,
July 10 until January 24, 2016 - No Colour Bar: Black British Art in Action 1960–1990 at the Guildhall Art Gallery, City of London,
July 18 until September 27 - Archibald, Wynne and Sulman Prizes annual exhibition at the Art Gallery of New South Wales in Sydney, Australia.
July 31 until November 8 - Masterpieces from the Hermitage: The Legacy of Catherine the Great at the National Gallery of Victoria in Melbourne, Australia.
August 14 until October 25 - Julia Margaret Cameron from the Victoria and Albert Museum, London, at the Art Gallery of New South Wales in Sydney, Australia.
September 5 until October 3 - "Concrete Cuba" at the David Zwirner Gallery, London and then January 7, 2016 until February 20, 2016 at the David Zwirner Gallery, New York City.
September 14 until February 7, 2016 - Picasso Sculpture at MOMA in New York City.
October 2 until October 29, 2016 - La Artcore gallery in Los Angeles, presented "Excessivist Initiative". The exhibition marked the beginning of the Excessivism movement. 
October 2 until January 17, 2016 - Archibald Motley: Jazz Age Modernist at the Whitney Museum of American Art in New York City.
October 7 until January 10, 2016 - Andrea del Sarto: The Renaissance Workshop in Action at the Frick Collection in New York City.
October 9 until January 6, 2016 - Alberto Burri: The Trauma of Painting at the Solomon R. Guggenheim Museum in New York City.
October 18 until January 10, 2016 - "Delacroix and the Rise of Modern Art"  curated by Patrick Noon and Christopher Riopelle at the Minneapolis Institute of Art in Minneapolis, Minnesota then traveled to the National Gallery in London, United Kingdom from February 17, 2016 until May 22, 2016.  
October 24 until February 14, 2016 - The Greats: masterpieces from the National Galleries of Scotland at the Art Gallery of New South Wales in Sydney, Australia.
October 30 until February 7, 2016 - Frank Stella: A Retrospective at the Whitney Museum of American Art in New York City.
November 5 until March 13, 2016 - Martin Wong: Human Instamatic at the Bronx Museum of Art.
November 19 until February 21, 2016 - Nari Ward: Sun Splashed at the Pérez Art Museum Miami.

Works
 Atelier Van Lieshout - "Domestikator"
 Banksy – Portrait of Steve Jobs at Calais jungle.
 Alberto Burri - Il Grande Cretto, Gibellina, Sicily, Italy (work begun in 1984 completed)
 Andy Edwards - Statue of The Beatles
 Dante Ferretti – Feeding the Planet, Energy for Life for Expo 2015 in Milan, Italy.
 Rowan Gillespie - Bust of Archbishop John Hughes permanently installed at the Old St. Patrick's Cathedral in New York City.
 Anthea Hamilton – Project for Door (After Gaetano Pesce)
 Robert Liberace - The Fifth Circle
 Peter Lundberg - Eye of Sauron installed on the Ossining, New York waterfront.
 Michael Mandiberg - "Print Wikipedia"
 Cornelia Parker and collaborators – Magna Carta (An Embroidery)
 Paul Rucker - "Storm in the Time of Shelter"
 Thomas Sayre - Kerf sculptures, Portland, Oregon
 Anne Storrs - Along These Lines, Portland, Oregon
 Emma Sulkowicz – Mattress Performance (Carry That Weight) continued from 2014 at Columbia University in New York City.
Adrián Villar Rojas, "The Most Beautiful of All Mothers" in the Sea of Marmara off the island of Büyükada and in front of the Turkish home in exile of Leon Trotsky as part of the 2015 Istanbul Biennial in Istanbul, Turkey
 Statue of Baphomet

Awards
Archibald Prize - Nigel Milsom for "Portrait of Charles Waterstreet
Artes Mundi Prize - Theaster Gates
Käthe Kollwitz Prize - Bernard Frize—The Venice Biennial  (May 9- November 22) --
Leone d'Oro for Lifetime Achievement: El Anatsui, Ghana
Leone d'Oro for the Best Artist of the international exhibition: Adrian Piper, United States
Leone d'Oro for the Best Young Artist: Im Heung-soon, South Korea
Leone d'Oro for Best Pavilion: Armenia; Haig Aivazian, Nigol Bezjian, Anna Boghiguian, Hera Büyüktaş, Silvina Der Meguerditchian, Ayreen Anastas and Rene Gabri, Mekhitar Garabedian, Aikaterini Gegisian, Yervant Gianikian and Ricci Lucchi, Aram Jibilian, Nina Katchadourian, Melik Ohanian, Mikayel Ohanjanyan, Rosana Palazyan, Sarkis, Hrair Sarkissian, curated by Adelina Cüberyan von Fürstenberg

Films
 The 100 Years Show

Deaths
January 4 - Elisabetta Catalano, 70, Italian fine-art photographer
January 5 - Milton Hebald, 97, American sculptor
January 13 - Jane Wilson, 90, American painter
January 15 - Walter Westbrook, 93, South African artist
January 16 
Ted Harrison, 88, British-born Canadian painter
Walter Peregoy, 89, American visual and animation background artist
January 22 -  Margaret Bloy Graham, 94, Canadian author and illustrator 
January 24 - Frances Lennon, 102, English painter and illustrator  
January 26 - Cleven "Goodie" Goudeau, 83, American greeting card artist
January 27 - Arturo Carmassi, 89, Italian sculptor and painter
January 29 - Will McBride, 84, American photographer
January 31 - Vasco Bendini, 93, Italian painter
February 3 - Walter Liedtke, 69, American art curator of European paintings (The Metropolitan Museum of Art)
February 7 - John C. Whitehead, 92, American baker, civil servant and art collector
February 12 - Tomie Ohtake, 101, Japanese-Brazilian artist
February 15.- Mikhail Koulakov, 82, Russian painter
February 21 - John Knapp-Fisher,  83, British painter
February 24 - Roger Cecil, 72, Welsh painter
March 1 - Carel Visser, 86, Dutch sculptor
March 4 - William King, 90, American sculptor
March 7 - Osi Rhys Osmond, Welsh painter and television presenter
March 11 - Inger Sitter, 85, Norwegian painter and graphic designer
March 12 - Michael Graves, 80, American architect
March 13 - Ismaïla Manga, 67, Senegalese painter
March 14 - Bodys Isek Kingelez, 66 or 67, Democratic Republic of Congo sculptor
March 17 - Kuniyoshi Kaneko, 78, Japanese painter, illustrator and photographer
March 21 - Hans Erni, 106, Swiss painter, designer and sculptor
March 24 - Otto Frello, 90, Danish artist and illustrator
March 26 - Albert Irvin, 92, British artist
March 27 - Michael Rush, American museum director (the Eli and Edythe Broad Art Museum)
March 31 - Betty Churcher, 84, Australian arts administrator and curator, director of the National Gallery of Australia (1990–1997)
April 2 - Paule Anglim, 90+, American gallerist
April 5 - Sargy Mann, 77, British painter
April 8 - Lars Tunbjörk, 59, Swedish photographer
April 9 -  Rafael Soriano, 94, Cuban painter
April 12 - Jože Ciuha, 90, Slovenian painter
April 15 - Judith Malina, 88, American actress, Co-founder of The Living Theater
April 16 - Giuseppe Zigaina. 91, Italian neorealist painter and author
May 4 - Eva Aeppli, 90, Swiss artist
May 7 - John Dixon, 86, Australian cartoonist (Air Hawk and the Flying Doctors)
May 8 - Menashe Kadishman, 82, Israeli painter and sculptor
May 10 
 Jack Body, 70, New Zealand composer and photographer  
Chris Burden, 69, American artist
William T. Cooper, 81, Australian ornithologist and illustrator 
Rachel Rosenthal, 88, French-born American performance artist
May 17 - Gerald Steadman Smith, 85, Canadian artist
May 23 - Carl Nesjar, 94, Norwegian painter and sculptor
May 25 - Mary Ellen Mark, 75, American photographer
June 2 - Miguel-Ángel Cárdenas, 80, Colombian-Dutch painter and illustrator
June 12 
Antoni Pitxot, 81, Spanish painter
Nek Chand Saini, 90, Indian sculptor
June 19 - Earl Norem, 92, American painter and illustrator 
June 20 - Miriam Schapiro, 91, Canadian-born American painter, sculptor and printmaker
June 22 - Don Featherstone, 79, American artist and inventor of the plastic pink flamingo
July 2 - David Aronson, 91, American painter
July 20 - Sally Gross, 81, American avant-garde choreographer, dancer
July 24 - Ingrid Sischy, 63, South African born art critic
August 4 -  Calle Örnemark, 81, Swedish sculptor
August 10 - Sunil Das, 76, Indian artist
August 16 - Melva Bucksbaum, 82, American art collector, curator, patron of the arts and vice chairwoman of the Whitney Museum board of trustees
August 28
 David Michie, 87, French-born British painter. (death announced on this date)
 Nelson Shanks, 77, American painter, cancer.
September 3  - Yevgeny Ukhnalyov, 83, Russian artist, co-author of the current coat of arms of Russia
September 6 - John Perreault, 78, American art critic
September 12 - Salvo, 68, Italian artist
September 15 - Cor Melchers, 61, Dutch painter
September 17 - Stojan Batič, 90, Slovene sculptor
September 19 - Brian Sewell, 84, British art critic
September 25 - Carol Rama, 97, Italian painter
September 26 - Paul Reed, 96, American painter
October 10 - Hilla Becher, 81, German photographer
October 15 - Bruce Mozert, 98, American photographer
October 25 - Wojciech Fangor, 92, Polish artist
November 3 - Judy Cassab, 95, Austrian-born Australian portrait painter
November 4 - Laila Pullinen, 82, Finnish sculptor.
November 7 - Pancho Guedes, 90, Portuguese architect and artist
November 12
Peter McLeavey, 79, New Zealand art dealer
Aaron Shikler, 93, American artist
November 25 - Eva Fuka, 88, Czech-born American photographer
November 26 - Eldzier Cortor, 99, American artist
December 6 - Holly Woodlawn, 69, Puerto Rican transgender actress and Warhol superstar
December 13 - Hema Upadhyay, 43, Indian artist
December 16 - George Earl Ortman, 89, American artist
December 27 - Ellsworth Kelly, 92, American artist

References

 
 
2010s in art
Years of the 21st century in art